Troitske is a village in the Sievierodonetsk Raion (district) of Luhansk Oblast in eastern Ukraine, on the banks of Luhan River. It was in Popasna Raion until that raion was abolished on 18 July 2020 as part of the administrative reform of Ukraine.

During the War in Donbass the settlement has been under attacks of pro-Russian forces on multiple occasions. On 16 January 2019 five Ukrainian servicemen from the 72nd Mechanized Brigade were wounded, and five others were injured at the village when their truck, Ural-4320, was hit by anti-tank guided missiles from Kalynove.

References

Bakhmutsky Uyezd

Villages in Sievierodonetsk Raion